At Newport '63 is a 1963 live album by jazz singer Joe Williams, recorded at the 1963 Newport Jazz Festival.

Reception

Billboard reviewed At Newport '63 upon its release in their 16 November 1963 issue. Billboard commented that "The performances are excitingly fresh with everyone improvising for the live audience. Joe should do a lot of business with this one".

John Bush, writing on Allmusic.com said of the album that "Williams displays all of his talents—a subtle blend of blues singer, band singer, and rhythm singer—and proves himself quite the triple threat in the process." Joel Roberts writing for All About Jazz said of the album that "Few jazz singers can handle the down-and-dirty blues as well as Williams, and with this stellar cast behind him, the results are predictably explosive".

Track listing 
 "Without a Song" (Edward Eliscu, Billy Rose, Vincent Youmans) - 1:35
 Spoken Word Introduction by Joe Williams - 1:14
 "Gravy Waltz" (Steve Allen, Ray Brown) - 2:20
 "She's Warm, She's Willing, She's Wonderful" (Marvin Fisher, Jack Segal) - 2:33
 "Come Back Baby" (Ray Charles, Lowell Fulson) - 4:42
 Medley: "All God's Chillun Got Rhythm"/"Do You Wanna Jump, Children?" (Walter Jurmann, Gus Kahn, Bronisław Kaper)/(Jimmy Van Heusen, Willie Bryant, Victor Selsman) - 2:45
 "Wayfaring Stranger" (traditional) - 13:32
 "Every Day I Have the Blues" (Pinetop Sparks) - 3:39
 "Anytime, Anyday, Anywhere" (Ned Washington, Lee Wiley, Victor Young) - 2:07
 "April in Paris" (Vernon Duke, E.Y. "Yip" Harburg) - 5:12
 "In the Evening (When the Sun Goes Down)" (Big Bill Broonzy, Leroy Carr, Don Raye) - 4:56
 "Some of This 'N' Some of That" (Mack David, Joe Williams, Sidney Wyche) - 3:50
 "Roll 'Em Pete" (Pete Johnson, Big Joe Turner) - 5:45

Personnel 
Performance
 Joe Williams – vocals, arranger
 Marl Young - arranger
 Bob Cranshaw - bass
 Mickey Roker - drums
 Clark Terry - flugelhorn, trumpet
 Junior Mance - piano
 Coleman Hawkins - tenor saxophone
 Zoot Sims - tenor saxophone
 Ben Webster - tenor saxophone
 Thad Jones - trumpet
 Howard McGhee - trumpet

Production
 George Avakian - liner notes, producer
 Mickey Crofford - engineer
 James Gavin - liner notes
 Charles Harbutt - mastering, mixing
 Ben Young - reissue producer
 Joshua Sherman - series producer

References 

1963 live albums
Albums produced by George Avakian
Albums recorded at the Newport Jazz Festival
Joe Williams (jazz singer) live albums
RCA Victor live albums